Karanjachromene is a pyranoflavonol, a type of flavonol. It is a fluorescent pyranoflavonoid isolated from the seed oil of Millettia pinnata.

References

Flavonols
Pyranochromenes
Phenol ethers